Number Two was the title of the chief administrator of The Village in the 1967-68 British television series The Prisoner. More than 17 different actors appeared as holders of the office during the 17-episode series (some episodes featured more than one "Number Two", most notably "It's Your Funeral" which featured two Number Twos in major roles and images of two others).

In the 2009 reboot series, Number Two was played by Ian McKellen, the character being referred to simply as "Two".

Background
The first episode, "Arrival", established that the person assigned to the position is frequently changed. Two Number Twos make repeat appearances: Leo McKern appeared in three episodes and Colin Gordon in two. With the exception of "Fall Out", this was the result of the actors performing their roles in two consecutive episodes filmed back to back. Colin Gordon was filmed in "The General" followed immediately with "A. B. and C.", McKern was featured in the series' second transmitted episode, "The Chimes of Big Ben," and then featured in the next production episode to be filmed "Once Upon a Time". Kenneth Griffith, Patrick Cargill and Georgina Cookson also appeared in more than one episode each: Griffith as the Judge/President in "Fall Out", Cargill as Thorpe in "Many Happy Returns", and Cookson as a woman at the party which Number Six hallucinates in "A, B and C". However, there is no indication as to whether their characters in these episodes are the same people as their Number Two characters.

The various Number Twos make use of several symbols of authority. One of these is the Seal, a large golden medallion, somewhat in the style of a mayoral chain, with the penny-farthing logo and the official title "Chief Administrator" is only seen in the episode "It's Your Funeral". Two more visible signs are a black, yellow and white scarf (similar in style to a British academic scarf) and a colourful seat stick umbrella (used as a cane). Most, though not all, Number Twos use these symbolic objects. Each Number Two is also served by the same diminutive, silent manservant, portrayed by Angelo Muscat, who appeared in every episode except "Many Happy Returns", "Living in Harmony" and "The Girl Who Was Death".

Only two Number Twos were removed as a punishment for failure: Patrick Cargill in "Hammer into Anvil" is manipulated by Number Six into reporting his own incompetence, and Colin Gordon in "A, B and C" is repeatedly warned over the telephone about the consequences of failure. In "A Change of Mind" Number Two is effectively driven out of The Village after Number Six manipulates the population to turn against him. In the episode "Free for All" the Village holds an election for Number Two, and the serving Number Two (Eric Portman) insists to Number Six that Number Twos are "democratically elected by the people". However, this election turns out to be another ploy to break Number Six.  In contrast, the Number Two of "The Chimes of Big Ben" (played by Leo McKern) ended the story with an agent on loan to the Village promising to report favourably to his superiors on his almost successful plan to trick Number Six into confessing.

Function
Number Twos often vary in personality, methods and aims. Most seek to extract information from Number Six, but others may seek to cause Number Six to accept his role in the Village, or to be recruited into the organisation running the Village. Most are intensely focused on Number Six, but others simply seek to maintain order and control in the Village, and will generally ignore Six beyond preventing his escape attempts. Most Number Twos are congenial and polite, but some are sadistic or simply brusque and rude. The schemes of the various Number Twos range from deception, intimidation, and elaborate role-play to the use of drugs and outright mind control. Number Twos are often seen reporting by telephone to an unseen higher authority, presumably Number One, who has the power to remove them; some Number Twos live in terror of their superiors, while others appear to have good or even personal relationships with them.

2009 remake
In the 2009 remake of the series, Number Two was played by actor Sir Ian McKellen in all six episodes.

In other media
In the comic book miniseries Shattered Visage, established as a sequel to The Prisoner, the Number Two featured is the version played by McKern, with the permission of McKern. In The Simpsons episode "The Computer Wore Menace Shoes", Number Two was voiced by Hank Azaria. In Xavier Mauméjean's short story "Be Seeing You!", from the second volume of the Tales of the Shadowmen anthology series, Denis Nayland Smith is the original Number 2, in 1912.

TV Guide included the character in their 2013 list of The 60 Nastiest Villains of All Time.

List of actors who played Number Two

Colin Gordon, Leo McKern, Mary Morris and Peter Wyngarde were the only Number Two actors whose voices featured in the title sequences of the episodes in which they appeared. The openings of "Arrival", "Do Not Forsake Me Oh My Darling", "Living in Harmony" and "Fall Out" did not include dialogue. In the title sequences of the remaining seven episodes the voice of Number Two was that of Robert Rietti.

With the death of Peter Wyngarde in 2018, Derren Nesbitt and Rachel Herbert are the only surviving actors to have portrayed the character.

References

Articles about multiple fictional characters
Fictional characters without a name
Fictional titles and ranks
Television characters introduced in 1967
The Prisoner characters